Héber Araujo dos Santos (born 10 August 1991), commonly known as Héber, is a Brazilian professional footballer who plays as a forward for Major League Soccer club Seattle Sounders FC.

Club career
In June 2016, Héber switched teams within the Croatian league, joining Rijeka from Slaven Belupo for a transfer fee of €450,000. He signed a three-year contract with the club with an option for a two-year extension.

On 21 March 2019, Héber joined Major League Soccer side New York City FC. He was the team's leading scorer for the 2019 season with 15 goals. In a match aganst Toronto FC, Héber tore his ACL, ending his 2020 season.

He was traded to Seattle Sounders FC on 29 December 2022 in exchange for $400,000 in General Allocation Money, with potential for a further $150,000 should certain conditions be met. Héber made his debut for the club in the 2022 FIFA Club World Cup and later scored in his first MLS match on 26 February against the Colorado Rapids.

Career statistics

Club

Honours
Alashkert
Armenian Premier League: 2015–16

New York City FC
MLS Cup: 2021
Campeones Cup: 2022

Individual
Armenian Premier League Top Sorer: 2015–16
SN Yellow Shirt Award: 2017–18

References

External links
 
 
 
 

1991 births
Living people
Brazilian footballers
Association football forwards
Armenian Premier League players
Croatian Football League players
Major League Soccer players
Figueirense FC players
Avaí FC players
FC Alashkert players
NK Slaven Belupo players
HNK Rijeka players
New York City FC players
Seattle Sounders FC players
Brazilian expatriate footballers
Brazilian expatriate sportspeople in Armenia
Expatriate footballers in Armenia
Brazilian expatriate sportspeople in Croatia
Expatriate footballers in Croatia
Brazilian expatriate sportspeople in the United States
Expatriate soccer players in the United States